Microbergeria is a genus of moths in the family Erebidae. It contains the single species Microbergeria luctuosa, which is found in Cameroon.

References

Natural History Museum Lepidoptera generic names catalog

Endemic fauna of Cameroon
Syntomini
Monotypic moth genera
Moths described in 1972
Moths of Africa